Ruby Cairo, also known as Deception, is a 1992 drama thriller film directed by Graeme Clifford. It stars Andie MacDowell, Liam Neeson and Viggo Mortensen.
One scene features Aleister Crowley's The Book of the Law.

Plot
When Bessie Faro's (Andie MacDowell) husband Johnny (Viggo Mortensen) dies in a plane crash in Veracruz, Mexico, she finds that his air cargo business is deeply in the red. When she visits the airline's terminal in Veracruz, she finds a packet of baseball cards that have been marked up by Johnny. Recognizing his system for marking betting slips at race tracks, she decodes the cards and realizes that they indicate a bank account. When she tries to withdraw money from the account, she is denied. She realizes that the account is in the name of the player on the card, Onix Concepción.

Back home, Bessie uses an International bank directory at the local library to decode Manny Sanguillén's Pittsburgh Pirates' card to find another bank account in Panama. She obtains durable power of attorney and begins a whirlwind trek to recover her husband's money. After Panama, she visits the Bahamas and the Cayman Islands, recovering tens of thousands of dollars from each account. In Germany, she closes Don Mueller's account from Berliner Bank, but the cashier hands her only 750 DM. He explains that 74,000DM worth of cashier's checks have been paid out to a company called EDK Technik in the former East Berlin. At EDK Technik, a manager informs Bessie that they make ink for ball point pens.

Bessie leaves the office confused as to why Johnny would be buying so much ink. The manager waits for her to leave and then ushers in some men who have been following Bessie on her journey. Her next stop is Athens, where she finds out that Johnny's account has already been closed. The teller takes Bessie to a safe deposit box which only contains a Bill Mazeroski card. Bessie's growing suspicion that Johnny is alive is confirmed by the sight of the card. When the teller sees how distraught Bessie is, she confides in her that a local shipping company cashed out some of Johnny's money and that the rest was wired to Cairo.

She visits Kolatos Shipping Company and finds that one of their boats is headed to Cairo with grain for a food aid effort. She rides with the cargo to Egypt, and notices that one of the dock workers is being stained green by a bag of grain. She sneaks onto the truck where he loaded the bag, opens it, and finds, hidden beneath the grain, containers of thionyl chloride manufactured by EDK Technik.

Bessie soon befriends the coordinator of the relief effort, Fergus Lamb (Liam Neeson). She explains what she found in the bag, and Fergus confronts his Operations Manager, who reveals that he allowed the smuggling to finance the grain shipments. Fergus is irate because he knows that the thionyl chloride is being used to manufacture chemical weapons.

Fergus and Bessie quickly fall in love, but she continues her journey, now intent on actually finding Johnny. A local Immigration Agent teams up with Bessie and helps her find Johnny. He admits to Bessie that he had been skimming from the chemical weapons traders, which is why he had to disappear. When Bessie leaves, Johnny runs after her and tries to make her stay with him, holding her at gunpoint in a crowded square. The men who have been following Bessie throughout the film now have Johnny in sight, and they immediately kill him.

The film ends with Bessie happily back at home with her family, just as Fergus arrives to reunite with her.

Principal cast

Production
According to Andie MacDowell, the director was stoned throughout filming.

Soundtrack
The soundtrack features music by John Barry, the theme song The Secrets of My Heart with lyric by Cynthia Haagens and Graeme Clifford, and the song You Belong to Me performed by Patsy Cline.

Release

Box Office
The film fared poorly at the box office, grossing only $608,866 in the United States.

Home Video
The film was retitled Deception when it was recut and released on video with 21 additional minutes of footage. Echo Bridge Entertainment released the film on DVD on April 26, 2011. The film debuted on Blu-ray on September 11, 2012, in a double feature with Ethan Frome (1993). Neither film has extras on the disc.

References

External links 

1992 films
Films directed by Graeme Clifford
American mystery films
Films shot in Egypt
Films shot in Germany
Films shot in Greece
Films shot in Athens
Films shot in Mexico
Films scored by John Barry (composer)
1990s English-language films
1990s American films